Comet 30P/Reinmuth, also known as Comet Reinmuth 1, is a periodic comet in the Solar System, first discovered by Karl Reinmuth (Landessternwarte Heidelberg-Königstuhl, Germany) on February 22, 1928.

First calculations of orbit concluded a period of 25 years, but this was revised down to seven years and speculation this was the same comet as Comet Taylor, which had been lost since 1915. Further calculations by George van Biesbroeck concluded they were different comets.

The 1935 approach was observed though not as favourable, in 1937 the comet passed close to Jupiter which increased the perihelion distance and orbital period.

Due to miscalculations, the 1942 appearance was missed, but it has been observed on every subsequent appearance since.

The comet nucleus is estimated to be 7.8 kilometers in diameter.

References

External links 
 Orbital simulation from JPL (Java) / Horizons Ephemeris
 30P/Reinmuth magnitude plot for 2010
 30P at Kronk's Cometography
 30P at Kazuo Kinoshita's Comets
 30P at Seiichi Yoshida's Comet Catalog

Periodic comets
0030
Discoveries by Karl Wilhelm Reinmuth
Comets in 2017
19280222